The Korallenoolith Formation is a geologic formation in Germany. It preserves fossils dating back to the Jurassic period. It predominantly consists of oolitic limestone.

See also 
 List of fossiliferous stratigraphic units in Germany

References
 

Geologic formations of Germany
Jurassic System of Europe
Jurassic Germany
Oxfordian Stage
Limestone formations
Paleontology in Germany